Domenic Marte (also known as Domenic M and D. Marte) is an American singer. In 2004, he released his debut album titled Intimamente (Intimately). Its lead single "Ven Tú" ("Come") peaked at #9 on the Billboard Tropical Chart; his duet with fellow American singer Luz Ríos, "Muero de Celos" ("Dying of Jealousy") reached #4 on the same chart. In 2005 at the 17th Lo Nuestro Awards, Marte received a nomination for Tropical New Artist of the Year.

Early life 
Domenic Marte was born and raised in Lawrence, Massachusetts. His father is from the Dominican Republic, while his mother is from Puerto Rico.

Career 

Marte is widely known and recognized for starting the bachata pop trend worldwide in 2004 with his first album Intimamente. "Ven Tu" was the first single released. It became a worldwide hit song and was in the top 10 of the Billboard Tropical Chart in 2004. The song is still being played on tropical, Spanish contemporary, and regional Mexican radio stations throughout the United States and abroad.

Marte also produced and arranged music on his albums. He wrote six songs on his first album, Intimamente, six songs on Deseos De Amarte, and six songs on The Voice.

In 2007, "Deseos De Marte" peaked at #5 on the Tropical Songs list.

In 2010 Marte was nominated for three awards (Song of the Year, Best Male Artist, and Tropical Traditional Artist of the Year) by Premio Lo Nuestro, a Univision award show.

In 2015 Marte became the first bachata singer to put out an all-English bachata album, entitled For the World. The album consists of 12 songs from his past albums Intimamente, Deseos De Amarte, and The Voice. It also includes covers of the songs "Pretty Woman" by Roy Orbison, "If Loving You Is Wrong" by Luther Ingram, and "Hard To Say I'm Sorry" by Chicago.

On June 22, 2016, Marte released his first single, "Como Quisiera", on his independent label DBR Records. This was the first single from his fifth album Al Fin Libre, scheduled for release in 2018.

On June 28, 2016, "Como Quisiera" debuted at #39on the American Music Charts under Tropical Latin Charts. This was the first single on his independent record label DBR Records.

On July 16, 2016, Marte's "Como Quisiera" debuted at #37 on the week of July 16, 2016, on the Billboard Tropical Chart as the highest ranking debut with a bullet on his song.

On August 29, 2016, Marte's song "Como Quisiera" passed "Muero De Celos" ("Dying of jealousy"), featuring Luz Rios on the Billboard Tropical Chart at #4 for the week of September 10, 2016. This was Marte's second song to chart in the top 5 on the Billboard Tropical Chart, and his first song at #4 on his label DBR Records.

On September 7, 2016, for the week of September 17, 2016, on the Billboard Tropical Chart, Marte reached the highest peak position in his career with "Como Quisiera" on DBR Records at #3. This passed his hit song "Muero De Celos" ft. Luz Rios, which peaked at #5 on the Billboard Tropical Chart in 2012.

On September 27, 2016, Marte's song "Como Quisiera" reached #1 on the Billboard chart for the first time.

In December 2016, Marte entered at #39 on the Billboard Tropical Chart with his highest duet debut single "No Ves Que Te Amo", feat Brenda K Starr.

On July 25, 2017, Marte entered the Billboard Tropical Chart with his highest debut entry, with "Yo Queria" at #22. This was the third single from his 2018 album, Al Fin Libre.

On April 21, 2018, Marte entered the Billboard Tropical Chart with "Tu Final" at #24.

On May 1, 2018, Marte made history with his second #1 song on BDS Neilson Tropical plays. From his Al Fin Libre album, "Tu Final" became the second song to reach #1.

In March 2018, Marte had his first #1 song on Music Choice on the Tropical Station, with "Tu Final". This was it his second #1 song on his new album Al Fin Libre.

Awards and recognition 
 "Premio Lo Nuestro" in 2005 and 2010 as Song of the Year / Male Artist of the year / Traditional Tropical Artist of the Year
 Billboard Latin Music Awards 2005 - Artist of the Year
 Latin Pride Awards 2008 - Artist of the Year
 Premios estrella de New York
 Premios Charolos
 Premios Ciculo Dorado

Discography

Studio albums 
 Íntimamente (2004)
 Deseos de Amarte (2007)
 The Voice (2013)
 For the World (2015)
 A Fin Libre (2018)

References

Living people
American bachata musicians
American singers of Dominican Republic descent
American musicians of Puerto Rican descent
People from Lawrence, Massachusetts
Year of birth missing (living people)
Bachata singers